Little is a populated place in Seminole County, Oklahoma at an elevation of 968 feet.  It is north of the City of Seminole and east of Shawnee, Oklahoma, located at the intersection of US Route 377 and Oklahoma State Highway 99A, just south of Interstate 40.  It had a post office from August 14, 1902 to November 30, 1916.  It was named for Thomas Little, a prominent Seminole and second chief of the tribe.

References

Unincorporated communities in Seminole County, Oklahoma
Unincorporated communities in Oklahoma